Wolverhampton railway works was in the city of Wolverhampton in the county of Staffordshire,  England. It was almost due north of the city centre, and is commemorated with a small display of level crossing gates and a plaque.  Known as the Stafford Road Works, it was opened by the Shrewsbury and Birmingham Railway in 1849 to maintain bought-in locomotives.

Overview

Wolverhampton works, located at Gorsebrook, north of Wolverhampton centre, became the workshop of the Northern Division of the Great Western Railway in 1854 under Joseph Armstrong who had been in charge of maintenance for the Shrewsbury and Chester Railway at Saltney. The first  line arrived at Wolverhampton and the running shed was rebuilt. Locomotive repairs were concentrated in Wolverhampton, while carriage and wagon work was transferred to Saltney.

Locomotives

Joseph Armstrong  was promoted to Swindon in 1864 and his brother George succeeded him. Wolverhampton became responsible for building standard gauge locomotives independently of Swindon and was expanded in 1858.

In comparison with Swindon, Wolverhampton was frustrated by having to maintain a great variety of different locomotives from the various lines that had been taken over. Much of its work, therefore, was in rebuilding and standardisation. However, once new construction started in 1859 (with two 2-2-2s designed by Joseph Armstrong) its independence showed. This was even true of the livery; that of Swindon engines was leaf green with oak brown frames, while Wolverhampton's were dark blue-green with red-brown frames.

Construction during George Armstrong's tenure consisted mainly of 0-4-2 tanks of the familiar 517 Class, and several classes of 0-6-0 saddle tanks, nearly all of which later became pannier tanks, and many of which would survive in that form into British Railways days.

As the broad gauge declined and was finally abolished in 1892, Swindon naturally took over as the GWR's main "narrow" (=standard) gauge locomotive builder. When George Armstrong retired, aged 75, in 1897, Swindon influence grew stronger at Wolverhampton. After producing some 800 locomotives, all new building ceased in 1908. The Works continued to repair and overhaul all classes of locomotive, from the humble tank engine to the King Class and BR Standard locomotives, until it closed in 1964.

Wolverhampton (Stafford Road) TMD

On reaching Wolverhampton in 1854, the GWR built their own  shed on the opposite side of the Stafford Road to the existing S&B works, between the road and the LMS line to Crewe. Located opposite and accessible from Dunstall Park railway station, the shed backed onto the Stafford Road, with it throat facing Wolverhampton Low Level railway station.

In 1860, the GWR added a  Old Oak Common pattern  turntable shed, with 28 access tracks all with their own inspection pits. But due to site access restrictions, sheds nos. 2 and 3 were not directly accessible from Wolverhampton Low Level.

As the major depot of the region, it was constructed as a heavy maintenance repair shop, to replace the functionality of the old S&B works. Hence under the Loans and Guarantees Act (1929): the old broad gauge sheds were demolished and replaced with new steel-framed sheds nos. 4 and 5; a new lifting and erection shop on the site of the old S&B depot; the salted roofs and timber trusses roofs of sheds nos. 1, 2 and 3 replaced by steel supports and corrugated iron; and a new two-ramp coaling stage plus additional  erected on the opposite side of the LMS line, closer to Wolverhampton Low Level. By this time the depot function of the old S&B shed had been replaced by the new standard-pattern two-turntable Wolverhampton Oxley depot, which was on the opposite side of the line, next to the freight yards and closer to Wolverhampton Low Level.

After reallocation of the depot to London Midland Region in January 1963, the decision was taken to close the now run down and highly dilapidated site, concentrating all remaining locomotives and work to Oxley. By this time sheds nos. 2 and 3 were effectively abandoned. The shed closed to all activity in September 1963, and was redeveloped as an industrial estate.

References
 H. Holcroft, Locomotive Adventure, Ian Allan Ltd, pp. 11–12, 21-52
 Simmons, J., (1986) The Railway in Town and Country, Newton Abott: David & Charles
 Larkin, E.J., Larkin, J.G., (1988) The Railway Workshops of Great Britain 1823-1986, Macmillan Press

Notes

Further reading

External links
 Locomotive Building in Wolverhampton

Railway workshops in Great Britain
Great Western Railway
Locomotive manufacturers of the United Kingdom
Rail transport in Wolverhampton
Buildings and structures in Wolverhampton
Railway depots in England